This is a list of the suburbs and localities of Albany, Western Australia.

Albany